Mereenie may refer to:
 Mereenie, Northern Territory, a locality in Australia
Mereenie velvet gecko, a species of gecko endemic to the Northern Territory of Australia